Egli (Swiss German: from a pet form of the ancient Germanic personal name Egenolf or Egilolf (see Egloff)) is both a given name and a surname.
Notable people with the given name include:
Egli Kaja (born 1997), Albanian footballer
Egli Trimi (born 1993), Albanian footballer

Notable people with the surname include:
Alphons Egli (1924–2016), Swiss politician
André Egli (born 1958), Swiss footballer
Beatrice Egli (born 1988), Swiss singer 
Charles Émile Egli (1877–1937), Swiss illustrator and painter
Fritz Egli (born 1937), Swiss motorcycle racer
Hans Egli, Swiss sports shooter
John Egli (1921-1982), American college men's basketball coach
Keith Egli (born c. 1962), Canadian politician
Paul Egli (1911–1997), Swiss road bicycle racer

Given names
Albanian-language unisex given names
Swiss-language surnames
Swiss-German surnames
Surnames from given names